Pseudoeurycea is a genus of salamander in the family Plethodontidae. The members of this genus are commonly known as the false brook salamanders. They are found in Mexico and Guatemala.

In order to preserve Ixalotriton and Bolitoglossa while avoiding paraphyly of Pseudoeurycea, species in the former "Pseudoeurycea bellii species group" have been moved to the genus Isthmura, and those in the former "Pseudoeurycea cephalica species group" to Aquiloeurycea.

Species
It contains the following species:

References

 
Amphibians of Central America
Amphibians of North America
Amphibian genera
Taxa named by Edward Harrison Taylor
Taxonomy articles created by Polbot